Bastian Heidenfelder (born 8 January 1986) is a retired German footballer and current assistant manager of 1. FC Heidenheim's U19 squad.

Coaching career
After retiring, Heidenfelder was hired as assistant to 1. FC Heidenheim's sporting director and was later promoted to sporting director. On 11 September 2017, Heidenfelder gave up his previous job at his own request and instead became a part of the club's academy staff. In addition, Heidenfelder would also work as assistant manager for the club's U19 squad.

References

External links

1986 births
Living people
German footballers
1. FC Heidenheim players
3. Liga players
Association football forwards
People from Ansbach
Sportspeople from Middle Franconia
Footballers from Bavaria